Krishnaguru Adhyatmik Visvavidyalaya or Krishnaguru Spiritual University is the sixth private university of Assam. The university is established by Krishnaguru Adhyatmik Visvavidyalaya Bill, 2017 which was passed by the Government of Assam on 9 March 2017. 

The Krishnaguru Foundation set the private spiritual university at Nasatra in Bajali district. The foundation was set up by spiritual guru Krishnaguru.

On 3 August 2017 Chief Minister Sarbananda Sonowal inaugurated Krishnaguru Adhyatmik Vishvavidyalaya. The university imparts contemporary education in blend with spiritualism.

Academic 
The university offers BA, BCom, BSc and MA degree in various department.

Department
Department of  Assamese
Department of  English
Department of Political Science
Department of Sociology
Department of Education
Department of Logic and Philosophy
Department of Economics
Department of Accountancy
Department of Finance
Department of Management
Department of Marketing
Department of Mathematics
Department of Chemistry
Department of Physics
Department of Botany
Department of Zoology
Department of Nursing
Department of Physiotherapy

References

External links 
 Official Website

Private universities in India
Universities in Assam
Bajali district
Educational institutions established in 2017
2017 establishments in Assam